Headwig Thusnelda Kniker (1891-1985) was an American geologist and micropaleontologist. Kniker, alongside fellow female geologists Alva Ellisor and Esther Applin, changed the landscape of oil well drilling in the United States through the use of foraminiferal micropaleontology.

Biography 
H.T. Kniker was born in 1891 in Gay Hill, Texas. After graduating as valedictorian from the Opera House School in New Braunfels in 1908 and becoming a teacher in Washington County, she began her studies at the University of Texas. There, she earned a B.A. in German, psychology and geology, graduating in 1916. The following year, she returned to the school to earn her M.A. alongside professor Francis Whitney, focusing on the subject of Cretaceous Bivalves. She graduated from the program in 1917. Her education continued in future years at Cornell University and the University of Chicago. 

Kniker worked with Fraccis Whitney at the Bureau of Economic Geology, a research branch of the Jackson School of Geosciences at her alma mater. There she remained until 1920 when she left the institution to work for a series of petroleum companies in the United States and Chile. Her work included the study of Cretaceous and Tertiary period well cuttings, as well as the study of Permian aged fusulinids and their stratigraphic significance. 

In her work, she is often credited as H. T. Kniker, a moniker used in order to avoid the gender-based discrimination which was prevalent in her field of work at the time. 

She retired in Seguin, Texas in the year 1950, moving to San Antonio twenty years later. Kniker died on October 12th, 1985.

Significant discovery 
In the 1920s, Hedwig and her coworkers, Esther Applin and Alva Ellisor, were given macrofossil samples by their company to study. These samples were too damaged to be considered useful in macrofossil study, but the microfossils were almost entirely intact. The most well-maintained of these specimens were the foraminifera. However, the majority of micropaleontologists at the time did not believe that the single celled organisms were diverse enough to have any practical applications and had therefore been ignored. Together, the women discovered that the species actually provided very detailed stratigraphic correlations and were incredibly useful in their field. Over the years this discovery was claimed by the men who had dismissed them and has been attributed to several different men since.

Legacy 
Upon her death in 1985, Kniker’s estate funded the addition of 39 bells to the University of Texas’ carillon. Following the completion of the project in 1987, the building was renamed the Kniker Carillon, in her honour. The carillon celebrates Kniker as one of the first female graduates in geology from the University of Texas.

A portion of the specimens that Kniker collected throughout her lifetime are contained within the Non-vertebrate Paleontology Laboratory’s Type Collection at the Jackson School Museum of Earth History, a division of the University of Texas.

References 

1891 births
1985 deaths
American geologists
Micropaleontologists
Scientists from Texas
University of Texas alumni
University of Chicago alumni
Cornell University alumni